Nicholas "Tha Axe Man" Walters (born 4 January 1986) is a Jamaican professional boxer. He held the WBA featherweight title from 2012 to 2015 and challenged once for the WBO junior lightweight title in 2016. Walters quit boxing in the seventh round of his world title fight against Ukrainian Vasiliy Lomachenko in Las Vegas, remaining on his stool following round 7.

Personal life 
Born in Montego Bay, Walters attended the Roehampton Primary and Anchovy High School. Walters is nicknamed "The Axe Man". He is the son of former boxer Job Walters. He began boxing at the age of ten and had his first professional fight at the age of 22 against Estaban Ramos of Panama.

Amateur career
Walters had a successful amateur career prior to turning professional, winning the 2005 and 2006 Caribbean Championships gold medal at featherweight, and falling short at the 2007 World Championships at featherweight against Bashir Hassan and in 2008 at the America´s Olympic Qualifier at featherweight against Miguel Marriaga. He later went on to defeat Marriaga as a professional.

Professional career 

Walters captured the WBA Fedelatin title in 2009, and successfully defended it four times. He won the vacant WBA (Regular) World Featherweight title on 8 December 2012, against Colombian Daulis Prescott during the annual KO Drugs Festival in Jamaica, via seventh round knockout.

Walters vs. Donaire 
Making good on his prediction of a knockout in either the 5th or 6th round, Walters defeated Nonito Donaire on 18 October 2014, by technical knockout in the 6th round to capture the WBA World Featherweight Championship. He was promoted to Super Champion status in February 2015.

Walters vs. Marriaga 
He originally weighed in at 127.4 pounds for the fight against Miguel Marriaga, who weighed in at 125.2 pounds. Walters was given 2 hours to drop to at least 126 pounds, the maximum limit of the Featherweight division. Walters did not succeed, being able only to drop to 127 pounds. Thus, he was stripped of the title. Even though he defeated Marriaga, he did not win the title back, which still remains vacant.

Walters vs. Sosa 
He then moved to 130lbs, where he was held to a draw by fellow former champion, Jason Sosa. Most observers thought Walters clearly won, and the result was controversial. Despite a dominant performance by Walters, one judge had Sosa winning the fight, 96-94, while the other two had it a draw, 95-95.

Walters vs. Lomachenko 
Walters remained inactive for a year following this fight, before taking on Vasiliy Lomachenko in Las Vegas. Lomachenko, who was considered as one of the best pound-for-pound fighters in the world, dominated the fight before Walters quit in the seventh round.

Professional boxing record

References

External links

Nicholas Walters - Profile, News Archive & Current Rankings at Box.Live

1986 births
Living people
World Boxing Association champions
Jamaican male boxers
People from Montego Bay
Super-featherweight boxers
World featherweight boxing champions
Boxers at the 2006 Commonwealth Games
Commonwealth Games competitors for Jamaica
Central American and Caribbean Games bronze medalists for Jamaica
Competitors at the 2006 Central American and Caribbean Games
Central American and Caribbean Games medalists in boxing